The following is a list of gangs, criminal enterprises, and crime syndicates in New Zealand.

Maori and Polynesian gangs
New Zealand Nomads
Head Hunters Motorcycle Club
Mongrel Mob
King Cobras
Tribesmen Motorcycle Club
Black Power
Killer Beez
BTW (Bad Troublesome Ward)
Aotearoa Natives

Drug cartels
Sinaloa Cartel

Crips and Bloods subsets
Crip Family (36)
Tongan Crip Gang
Dope Money Sex
Neighbourhood Crips
Junior Crip Boys
United Blood Nation

Triad
Sam Gor
14K
Sun Yee On
Shui Fong
Big Circle Gang

Caucasian/white supremacist
Right Wing Resistance
Sadistic Souls Motorcycle Club
Crew 38 
Ruthless Boot Boys
Rodent Aryan Brotherhood
White Power Creed 
Chaos Skins

Outlaw motorcycle clubs
Comancheros
Outcasts Motorcycle Club
Head Hunters Motorcycle Club
Devils Henchmen
Lone Legion Brotherhood
Greazy Dogs
Highway 61 Motorcycle Club
Tyrants Motorcycle Club
Mothers Motorcycle Club
Hells Angels
Red Devils Motorcycle Club
Barbarian Stormtroopers
Bandidos Motorcycle Club
Southern Vikings
Rebels Motorcycle Club
Forty Five Motorcycle Club
Road Knights
Filthy Few Motorcycle Club
Huhu Motorcycle Club
Magog Motorcycle Club
Outlaws Motorcycle Club
Satans Slaves Motorcycle Club
Mongols Motorcycle Club
Sinn Fein Motorcycle Club

Defunct organized crime groups
Lost Breed - Former outlaw motorcycle club. Shut down by the Hells Angels in 2015.
Fourth Reich
Epitaph Riders

See also
 Gangs in New Zealand

References 

Lists of gangs